Ghansi or Ghasi was a Nepali grasscutter who is best remembered for inspiring Bhanubhakta Acharya to translate the Sanskrit epic Ramayana into the Nepali language. He made money by cutting grass and selling it. Ghansi built a well in order to be remembered after his death. Not much is known about him except that he belonged to the Pantha caste and lived near the well. He has been portrayed by multiple actors in film, and the tourist destination Ghansikuwa was named after him.

Life 
One day, as Bhanubhakta Acharya sat on a stone slab in an unfrequented forest, he fell asleep while listening to birds chirping. When he awoke, he saw a person cutting grass. Acharya asked him about his whereabouts and Ghansi replied that he was a poor farmer who lived next to Acharya's village. He made money by cutting grass and selling it in the market. Ghansi told Acharya about his plan to build a well so that passers-by could be refreshed, and he could be remembered after his death. 

His words had a great impact on Acharya, who wrote in a poem that the "grasscutter has taught me a great lesson", and he is credited as one of the inspirations for Acharya's translation of the Sanskrit epic Ramayana into the Nepali language.

Ghansi built Ghasi Kuwa in Vyas Municipality near the Prithvi Highway. The well is awaiting preservation. According to the Bhanu Ghansi Memorial Park Conservation Committee, Ghansi belonged to the Pantha caste and lived near the well which he constructed. They added it was difficult to identify him due to Acharya not mentioning his name in his writings.

Legacy 
Ghansi was portrayed in several films. In Aadi Kabi Bhanubhakta (1999), he is portrayed by Rajpal Thapa. In Raat Chirnya Bhanu (2017), he is portrayed by Basudev Khanal. Additionally, in Tanahun District, there is a statue of Ghansi, as well as a statue of Bhanubhakta Acharya at Bhanu Ghansi Memorial Park. Ghansikuwa, a tourist destination in Tanahu District is named after Ghansi.

See also
Bhanubhakta Ramayana

References 

Nepalese people
People from Tanahun District
19th-century Nepalese people
Nepalese engineers